Gephyromantis striatus, commonly known as the wrinkled Madagascar frog, is a species of frog in the family Mantellidae.  It is endemic to Madagascar.  Its natural habitats are subtropical or tropical moist lowland forests and rivers.  It is threatened by habitat loss.

References

striatus
Endemic fauna of Madagascar
Taxonomy articles created by Polbot
Amphibians described in 2002